†Harmogenanina subdetecta was a species of air-breathing land snails or semislugs, terrestrial pulmonate gastropod mollusks in the family Helicarionidae.

This species was endemic to Réunion. It is now extinct.

References

Harmogenanina
Extinct gastropods
Taxonomy articles created by Polbot